Buyan may refer to:

Folklore
 Buyan, an island in Slavic mythology

History

Mongolia
 Bayan (khan) (reigned 1302-1309), also known as Buyan, khan of the White Horde
 Buyan Suldus (died 1362), a clan leader of one segment of the Suldus clan of the Taichiud tribe during the 1350s to the 1360s
 Buyan Sechen Khan (1554-1604), Mongol khan of the Northern Yuan Dynasty

Russia
 The Stary Buyan Republic, a short-lived peasant republic within Samara Governorate, the Russian Empire

Locations
 Lake Buyan, a lake near Lake Tamblingan on the island of Bali, Indonesia
 Buyan, a location in Russia

Other uses
 Buyan-class corvette, a class of corvette ships used by the Russian Navy
 Buyan, a traditional dance practiced by Sierra Leonean Americans

See also
 Ayurbarwada Buyantu Khan, fourth emperor of the Yuan Dynasty
 Baro-Bhuyan
 Bujan (disambiguation)
 Buyang people
 Buyang language
 Buyant (disambiguation)

Disambiguation pages